Michael Haydn's Symphony No. 23 in D major, Perger 43, Sherman 22, Sherman-adjusted 23, MH 287, is believed to have been written in Salzburg around 1779. It was attributed to Wolfgang Amadeus Mozart in Ludwig von Köchel's original catalog as K. 291.

Scored for 2 oboes, 2 bassoons, 2 horns and strings, in three movements:

Allegro assai
Andantino, in D minor, changing to D major at measure 65
Fugato. Presto mà non troppo

The slow movement begins in D minor, without winds at first.

The oboes and horns come in with the change to D major.

The third movement was at first mistaken by Köchel for a work of Mozart's. Mozart did in fact copy out the first 45 measures of it (Simon Sechter completed the score of the finale). Some time afterwards, he wrote his String Quartet in G major, K. 387, with a finale that is also a fugato and also begins with a theme consisting of four whole notes first stated by the second violin.

Having the first 45 measures in Mozart's hand, it was natural for Köchel to assume that Mozart was the author.

This symphony is one of the few by Michael Haydn to have a slow movement in a minor key (the others are No.s 6, 9 and 20) though in this one the D minor key signature changes to D major around the middle for the rest of the movement. Horns in D are used throughout, and in the fugal finale they even get to play the fugue subject a couple of times.

Discography

This symphony is available on a VoxBox 2-disc set together with seven other symphonies, and on the CPO label on a CD with Symphonies No.s 1C, 22 and 33, conducted by Johannes Goritzki, who in the first movement adds an exposition repeat not indicated by the Sherman edition.

References

 A. Delarte, "A Quick Overview Of The Instrumental Music Of Michael Haydn" Bob's Poetry Magazine November 2006: 35 
 Charles H. Sherman and T. Donley Thomas, Johann Michael Haydn (1737 - 1806), a chronological thematic catalogue of his works. Stuyvesant, New York: Pendragon Press (1993)
 C. Sherman, "Johann Michael Haydn" in The Symphony: Salzburg, Part 2 London: Garland Publishing (1982): lxviii

Symphony 23
Compositions in D major
1779 compositions